Kevin Curtin is an association football player who represented New Zealand at international level.

Curtin made his full All Whites debut with a substitute appearance in a 1–3 loss to Australia on 9 October 1972 and ended his international playing career with 18 A-international caps to his credit, his final cap a substitute appearance in a 1–1 draw, also against Australia on 30 March 1977.

References

External links

Living people
New Zealand association footballers
New Zealand international footballers
Association football goalkeepers
1973 Oceania Cup players
Year of birth missing (living people)